Farlowella amazonum is a species of armored catfish native to Argentina and Brazil where it is found in Tocantins, La Plata and Amazon basins.  This species grows to a length of  SL.

References 
 

amazonum
Catfish of South America
Catfish
Catfish
Catfish
Fish described in 1864
Taxa named by Albert Günther